Varnoli Nani (or Nani Varnoli or Vanta Varnoli) is a village and former Rajput non-salute princely state in Gujarat, western India.

History 
The petty princely state, belonging to the Pandu Mehwas division of Rewa Kantha, was ruled by Rajput Chieftains. 

In 1901 it comprised only the single village, covering 1 square mile, with a population of 74, yielding 346 Rupees state revenue (1903-4, mostly from land), paying 19 Rupees tribute, to the Gaekwar Baroda State.

See also 
 Varnol Mal, neighboring princely state
 Varnoli Moti, neighboring princely state

References

Sources and external links 
 Imperial Gazetteer, on DSAL.UChicago.edu - Rewa Kantha

Princely states of Gujarat
Rajput princely states